Pan Lei (born 26 October 1988) is a Chinese snowboarder. She competed in the women's halfpipe event at the 2006 Winter Olympics.

References

1988 births
Living people
Chinese female snowboarders
Olympic snowboarders of China
Snowboarders at the 2006 Winter Olympics
Place of birth missing (living people)
21st-century Chinese women